was a Japanese castle of the kōgoishi type, constructed in the late 7th century by the Yamato Imperial court. The site, atop Kijō Mountain in what is today the Okayama Prefecture town of Sōja, is considered a national monument. Portions of the castle were reconstructed in the early 2000s.

The castle's name literally means "demon castle" (ki is another reading for the character for oni); according to a traditional fable, a demon named Onra or Ura once ruled Kibi Province from the castle.

Legend
The castle is the basis of the myth that is associated with the folklore hero, Momotarō. The legendary story of Kibitsuhiko-no-mikoto and Ura explains that the Prince Ura of Kudara used to live in Kinojo (castle of the devil) and was a cause of trouble for the people living in the village. The emperor's government sent Kibitsuhiko-no-mikoto (Momotarō)  to defeat Ura.

History
Following the defeat of Yamato Japan in the 663 battle of Hakusukinoe by an alliance of Tang China and the Korean kingdom of Silla, Emperor Tenji ordered the construction of defenses against a possible invasion. According to the Nihonshoki, twelve Korean-style mountain fortifications were built in western Japan at this time, and it is believed that Ki castle was one of them. The identification of particular sites with the fortresses constructed at this time remains a subject of debate, and most fortifications of this period are classified under the wider term kōgoishi (神籠石).

The fortress was built atop Kijōyama (鬼城山, lit. Ki castle mountain), and used the topography and natural features as its primary defenses. Its elevation granted it the tactical high ground, and the trees and other foliage, not cleared entirely, provided additional obstacles to attackers. Simple stone walls and earthworks 2.8 km in perimeter surrounded the site. There were four gates pointing arranged to the cardinal directions, and a fifth, so-called "water gate," through which water could be drained out of the fort. Within the fortress, the remains of a number of buildings have been found, including a smoke tower, well, and food storehouse.

The site was formally examined by government officials in 1999, and permission was granted to begin research and reconstruction. Excavation and restoration has been carried out since then, though care has been taken to protect the natural environment in and around the site.

Gallery

See also
 List of foreign-style castles in Japan

References

Literature

External links 

Castles in Okayama Prefecture
Tourist attractions in Okayama Prefecture
Historic Sites of Japan